The first season of the reality television series Black Ink Crew: Chicago aired on VH1 from  October 26, 2015 until December 28, 2015. It chronicles the daily operations and staff drama at an African American owned and operated tattoo shop 9MAG located in Chicago, Illinois.

Main cast

Ryan Henry
Katrina Jackson
Van Johnson
Phor Brumfield
Don Brumfield
Charmaine Walker 
Danielle Jamison

Recurring cast
Ashley Pickens 
Terrance
Rachel

Episodes

References

2015 American television seasons
Black Ink Crew